"When I'm Gone" is the first single from Simple Plan's self-titled third studio album, Simple Plan. It was released via iTunes and lala.com on October 29, 2007, in conjunction with a live webchat from the band.

History
A 25-second preview of the song was premiered on October 24, 2007 on simpleplan.com. The full song was premiered on simpleplan.com on October 29, 2007. It was done so in conjunction with a webchat with the band members, 
who answered fan questions during the chat.

The song was made available on iTunes the same day and the album was available for preorder on lala.com the following day (with a download of the single immediately available).

Music video
The band flew to Los Angeles on November 8, 2007 and filmed the video. It was filmed on Sunset Blvd and then in a soundstage outside North Hollywood. Perez Hilton filmed a cameo.

A 40-second pre-production preview of the video was aired on TRL and added to Simple Plan's website on November 6, 2007.

The video was premiered on MTV.com on December 10, 2007, and MuchMusic on December 11.  Frank Borin and the band directed the video.

The music video has been available through the band's official channel on YouTube since December 13, 2007 and has since gotten over 17 million views as of December 2013 

The music video is about a young woman, played by Zoe Myers, who drives around town to cope with her recent breakup with a former lover, played by Bouvier.  She has not got over him, which makes her see him everywhere she goes.  In the end, she freaks out and calls Bouvier.  Bouvier sees who is calling and ignores the call and continues to enjoy his bottle of beer. Scenes with the band playing against a black backdrop are shown throughout the video.

Reception

The song received a lot of airplay in 2007, making it the most successful single from the album. The song also received positive reviews from critics. Rolling Stone called it "a seize-the-day anthem with a cathartic refrain". Entertainment Weekly in their review of the album recommended downloading "When I'm Gone".

Charts

Weekly charts

Year-end charts

Track listing

References

2007 singles
Simple Plan songs
Songs written by Danja (record producer)
Song recordings produced by Danja (record producer)
Songs written by Pierre Bouvier
Songs written by Chuck Comeau
Songs written by Arnold Lanni
2007 songs
Lava Records singles
Atlantic Records singles